In mathematics, a recurrence relation is an equation according to which the th term of a sequence of numbers is equal to some combination of the previous terms. If the values of the first  numbers in the sequence have been given, the rest of the sequence can be calculated by repeatedly applying the equation.

In linear recurrences, the th term is equated to a linear function of the  previous terms. A famous example is the recurrence for the Fibonacci numbers,

where the order  is two and the linear function merely adds the two previous terms.

The concept of a recurrence relation can be extended to multidimensional arrays, that is, indexed families that are indexed by tuples of natural numbers.

Definition
A recurrence relation is an equation that expresses each element of a sequence as a function of the preceding ones. More precisely, in the case where only the immediately preceding element is involved, a recurrence relation has the form

where 

is a function, where  is a set to which the elements of a sequence must belong.

It is easy to modify the definition for getting sequences starting from the term of index 1 or higher.

This defines recurrence relation of first order. A recurrence relation of order  has the form 

where  is a function that involves  consecutive elements of the sequence.
In this case,  initial values are needed for defining a sequence.

Examples

Factorial
The factorial is defined by the recurrence relation

and the initial condition

This is an example of a linear recurrence with polynomial coefficients of order 1, with the simple polynomial 

as its only coefficient.

Logistic map
An example of a recurrence relation is the logistic map:

with a given constant ; given the initial term  each subsequent term is determined by this relation.

Fibonacci numbers
The recurrence of order two satisfied by the Fibonacci numbers is the canonical example of a homogeneous linear recurrence relation with constant coefficients (see below).  The Fibonacci sequence is defined using the recurrence

with initial conditions

Explicitly, the recurrence yields the equations

etc.

We obtain the sequence of Fibonacci numbers, which begins
0, 1, 1, 2, 3, 5, 8, 13, 21, 34, 55, 89, ...

The recurrence can be solved by methods described below yielding Binet's formula, which involves powers of the two roots of the characteristic polynomial ; the generating function of the sequence is the rational function

Binomial coefficients
A simple example of a multidimensional recurrence relation is given by the binomial coefficients , which count the ways of selecting  elements out of a set of  elements.
They can be computed by the recurrence relation

with the base cases . Using this formula to compute the values of all binomial coefficients generates an infinite array called Pascal's triangle. The same values can also be computed directly by a different formula that is not a recurrence, but uses factorials, multiplication and division, not just additions:

The binomial coefficients can also be computed with a uni-dimensional recurrence:

with the initial value  (The division is not displayed as a fraction for emphasizing that it must be computed after the multiplication, for not introducing fractional numbers).
This recurrence is widely used in computers because it does not require to build a table as does the bi-dimensional recurrence, and does involve very large integers as does the formula with factorials (if one uses  all involved integers are smaller than the final result).

Difference operator and difference equations  

The  is an operator that maps sequences to sequences, and, more generally, functions to functions. It is commonly denoted  and is defined, in functional notation, as 

It is thus a special case of finite difference.

When using the index notation for sequences, the definition becomes

The  is 
 A simple computation shows that

This relation can be inverted, giving

A  of order  is an equation that involves the  first differences of a sequence or a function, in the same way as a differential equation of order  relates the  first derivatives of a function.

The two above relations allow transforming a recurrence relation of order  into a difference equation of order , and, conversely, a difference equation of order  into recurrence relation of order . Each transformation is the inverse of the other, and the sequences that are solution of the difference equation are exactly those that satisfies the recurrence relation.

For example, the difference equation

is equivalent to the recurrence relation

in the sense that the two equations are satisfied by the same sequences.

As it is equivalent for a sequence to satisfy a recurrence relation or to be the solution of a difference equation, the two terms "recurrence relation" and "difference equation" are sometimes used interchangeably. See Rational difference equation and Matrix difference equation for example of uses of "difference equation" instead of "recurrence relation"

Difference equations resemble to differential equations, and this resemblance is often used to mimic methods for solving differentiable equations to apply to solving difference equations, and therefore recurrence relations.

Summation equations relate to difference equations as integral equations relate to differential equations. See time scale calculus for a unification of the theory of difference equations with that of differential equations.

From sequences to grids
Single-variable or one-dimensional recurrence relations are about sequences (i.e. functions defined on one-dimensional grids). Multi-variable or n-dimensional recurrence relations are about -dimensional grids. Functions defined on -grids can also be studied with partial difference equations.

Solving

Solving linear recurrence relations with constant coefficients

Solving first-order non-homogeneous recurrence relations with variable coefficients
Moreover, for the general first-order non-homogeneous linear recurrence relation with variable coefficients:

there is also a nice method to solve it:

Let 

Then 

Solving general homogeneous linear recurrence relations
Many homogeneous linear recurrence relations may be solved by means of the generalized hypergeometric series. Special cases of these lead to recurrence relations for the orthogonal polynomials, and many special functions. For example, the solution to

is given by

the Bessel function, while

is solved by

the confluent hypergeometric series. Sequences which are the solutions of linear difference equations with polynomial coefficients are called P-recursive. For these specific recurrence equations algorithms are known which find polynomial, rational or hypergeometric solutions.

Solving first-order rational difference equations

A first order rational difference equation has the form . Such an equation can be solved by writing  as a nonlinear transformation of another variable  which itself evolves linearly.

Stability

Stability of linear higher-order recurrences
The linear recurrence of order ,

has the characteristic equation

The recurrence is stable, meaning that the iterates converge asymptotically to a fixed value, if and only if the eigenvalues (i.e., the roots of the characteristic equation), whether real or complex, are all less than unity in absolute value.

Stability of linear first-order matrix recurrences

In the first-order matrix difference equation

with state vector  and transition matrix ,  converges asymptotically to the steady state vector  if and only if all eigenvalues of the transition matrix  (whether real or complex) have an absolute value which is less than 1.

Stability of nonlinear first-order recurrences
Consider the nonlinear first-order recurrence

 

A nonlinear recurrence could have multiple fixed points, in which case some fixed points may be locally stable and others locally unstable; for continuous f  two adjacent fixed points cannot both be locally stable.

Such a cycle is stable, meaning that it attracts a set of initial conditions of positive measure, if the composite function

with  appearing  times is locally stable according to the same criterion:

 

where  is any point on the cycle.

In a chaotic recurrence relation, the variable  stays in a bounded region but never converges to a fixed point or an attracting cycle; any fixed points or cycles of the equation are unstable.  See also logistic map, dyadic transformation, and tent map.

Relationship to differential equations 
When solving an ordinary differential equation numerically, one typically encounters a recurrence relation. For example, when solving the initial value problem

with Euler's method and a step size , one calculates the values

by the recurrence

Systems of linear first order differential equations can be discretized exactly analytically using the methods shown in the discretization article.

Applications

Mathematical biology 
Some of the best-known difference equations have their origins in the attempt to model population dynamics. For example, the Fibonacci numbers were once used as a model for the growth of a rabbit population.

The logistic map is used either directly to model population growth, or as a starting point for more detailed models of population dynamics. In this context, coupled difference equations are often used to model the interaction of two or more populations. For example, the Nicholson–Bailey model for a host-parasite interaction is given by

with  representing the hosts, and  the parasites, at time .

Integrodifference equations are a form of recurrence relation important to spatial ecology. These and other difference equations are particularly suited to modeling univoltine populations.

Computer science
Recurrence relations are also of fundamental importance in analysis of algorithms. If an algorithm is designed so that it will break a problem into smaller subproblems (divide and conquer), its running time is described by a recurrence relation.

A simple example is the time an algorithm takes to find an element in an ordered vector with  elements,  in the worst case.

A naive algorithm will search from left to right, one element at a time.

A better algorithm is called binary search. However, it requires a sorted vector. It will first check if the element is at the middle of the vector. If not, then it will check if the middle element is greater or lesser than the sought element. At this point, half of the vector can be discarded, and the algorithm can be run again on the other half. The number of comparisons will be given by

the time complexity of which will be .

Digital signal processing 
In digital signal processing, recurrence relations can model feedback in a system, where outputs at one time become inputs for future time. They thus arise in infinite impulse response (IIR) digital filters.

For example, the equation for a "feedforward" IIR comb filter of delay  is:

where  is the input at time ,  is the output at time , and  controls how much of the delayed signal is fed back into the output.  From this we can see that

etc.

Economics

Recurrence relations, especially linear recurrence relations, are used extensively in both theoretical and empirical economics.  In particular, in macroeconomics one might develop a model of various broad sectors of the economy (the financial sector, the goods sector, the labor market, etc.) in which some agents' actions depend on lagged variables.  The model would then be solved for current values of key variables (interest rate, real GDP, etc.) in terms of past and current values of other variables.

See also

 Holonomic sequences
 Iterated function
 Orthogonal polynomials
 Recursion
 Recursion (computer science)
 Lagged Fibonacci generator
 Master theorem (analysis of algorithms)
 Circle points segments proof
 Continued fraction
 Time scale calculus
 Combinatorial principles
 Infinite impulse response
 Integration by reduction formulae
 Mathematical induction

References

Footnotes

Bibliography 
 
 
 
 
 Thomas H. Cormen, Charles E. Leiserson, Ronald L. Rivest, and Clifford Stein. Introduction to Algorithms, Second Edition. MIT Press and McGraw-Hill, 1990. . Chapter 4: Recurrences, pp. 62–90.

 chapter 7.
  Chapter 9.1: Difference Equations.
 
  at EqWorld - The World of Mathematical Equations.
  at EqWorld - The World of Mathematical Equations.

External links 
 
 
  OEIS index to a few thousand examples of linear recurrences, sorted by order (number of terms) and signature (vector of values of the constant coefficients)

Algebra
 
Combinatorics